Cuando Los Ángeles Lloran (English: When the Angels Cry) is the eighth album and fourth studio album  by  Mexican rock band Maná. It was the first album to feature their new guitarist Sergio Vallín replacing Ulises Calleros & César "Vampiro" López. As of 1996, it sold over 1.5 million copies.

Cuando Los Ángeles Lloran was nominated for a 1996 Grammy Award for Best Latin Pop Performance.

Track listing

Personnel
 Fher Olvera – lead vocals, acoustic guitar, electric guitar, harmonics, choir
 Alex González – drums, electric percussion, lead vocals in "Como Un Perro Enloquecido" and "El Borracho", choir
 Juan Calleros – bass guitar
 Sergio Vallín; acoustic guitar, electric guitar, sitar coral

Invited Guests
Juan Carlos Toribio – keyboards, piano, Hammond B-3 organ
Luis Conte – percussions
David Hidalgo – accordion on "El Borracho"
David Shamban – cello on "Hundido En Un Rincón"
Ramon Flores – brass on "Déjame Entrar"
Eric Jorgensen – brass on "Déjame Entrar"
Jene Burkert – brass on "Déjame Entrar"
Charles David – brass on "Déjame Entrar"

Charts

Sales and certifications

References

1995 albums
Maná albums
Warner Music Latina albums